The Papaloteca River is a river whose mouth runs through Nueva Armenia, in Honduras, flowing into the Caribbean Sea.

See also
List of rivers of Honduras

References

Rivers of Honduras